Babies for Sale is a 1940 American film noir crime drama film directed by Charles Barton and starring Rochelle Hudson, Glenn Ford and Miles Mander.

Plot
A newsman exposes a doctor running an adoption ring from a home for expectant mothers.

Cast
 Rochelle Hudson as Ruth Williams
 Glenn Ford as Steve Burton / Oscar Hanson
 Miles Mander as Dr. Wallace Rankin
 Joe De Stefani as Dr. John Gaines (as Joseph Stefani)
 Isabel Jewell as Edith Drake
 Georgia Caine as Iris Talbot
 Eva Hyde as Gerda Honaker
 Selmer Jackson as Arthur Kingsley
 Mary Currier as Mrs. Thelma Kingsley
 Edwin Stanley as Mr. Edwards
 Douglas Wood as Dr. Ateshire
 John Qualen as Howard Anderson
 Helen Brown as Mrs. Howard Anderson

Production notes
In April 1940 The New York Times reported that Evelyn Young was to receive the female lead in Babies for Sale. Young would soon receive other lead roles in Columbia films but that of Babies for Sale went to Rochelle Hudson.

See also
 List of American films of 1940

References
 The Westerners: Interviews with Actors, Directors, Writers and Producers, by C. Courtney Joyner

External links
 
 

1940 drama films
1940s English-language films
1940 films
Films directed by Charles Barton
Columbia Pictures films
American drama films
American black-and-white films
1940s American films